Georgia Isobel Groome (born 11 February 1992) is an English actress. She is best known for her roles in the films London to Brighton (2006) and Angus, Thongs and Perfect Snogging (2008).

Early life
Groome was born on 11 February 1992 in Nottingham, the daughter of Paul Groome (1963-2009), a publican and chef, and Fiona (née Tulloch) Watson, a drama and vocal coach. She resided in Swarkestone, Derbyshire. She has two sisters, Alexandra, a dance teacher and Eden, a dancer.  Groome, at the age of nine, auditioned for a role in the touring stage version of the musical Annie Get Your Gun and got the part. She trained at her mother’s performing arts school, at Nottingham Television Workshop, Derby Youth Theatre, and Trent College.

Career
Groome made her acting debut in the 2001 TV film, A Fish Out of Water. She subsequently played an orphan in an episode of the short-lived TV series, Dangerville.

When Groome was just 14 years old, she landed her first feature film role in the well-received British independent film London to Brighton in 2006, playing an 11-year-old runaway. That year, she was also one of the eight young adventurers on Serious Amazon for CBBC. In 2007, Groome had a role in Elaine Wickham's short, My Mother.

In 2008, Groome had a minor role in the comedy-horror The Cottage. Her breakthrough role was as 14-year-old, boyfriend-searching Georgia Nicolson alongside Aaron Johnson in the 2008 film Angus, Thongs and Perfect Snogging, for which she won the award for Best Child Actor at the Buster International Children's Film Festival. She also had a minor role in horror film The Disappeared.

In 2009, she made her stage debut in Tusk Tusk, a new play by Polly Stenham at the Royal Court Theatre in London. The same year, she appeared in the short Leaving Eva and an episode of The Bill. In 2010, Groome appeared in an episode of British television detective drama Lewis, as well as the short Silent Things.

In 2011, Groome starred in two shorts, The True Meaning of Love and Six Degrees. She also appeared in Susan Jacobson's The Holding and had a lead role in The Great Ghost Rescue, a film adaptation of Eva Ibbotson's book of the same name.

She appeared alongside Stephen Dillane in Papadopoulos & Sons, in which she played snobby fashion victim Katie. The film was released in the UK through Cineworld on 5 April 2013.

Personal life
Groome has been in a relationship with actor Rupert Grint since 2011. They have a daughter, Wednesday, born in May 2020.

Filmography

Film

Television

Radio

Theatre

References

External links
 

Living people
Alumni of King's College London
21st-century English actresses
English child actresses
English film actresses
People from Nottingham
English television actresses
English radio actresses
People educated at Trent College
Actresses from Nottinghamshire
People from Chellaston
1992 births